This is a list of skate punk bands. Skate punk is a subgenre of punk rock.

 
 88 Fingers Louie
 Agression
 Belvedere
 Big Boys
 Bigwig
 Blink-182
 Cardiel
 Cerebral Ballzy
 Charlie Brown Jr.
 Cryptic Slaughter
 The Decline (band) 
 Drunk Injuns
 Excel
 Face to Face
 The Faction
 FIDLAR
 Frenzal Rhomb
 Gang Green
 Goldfinger
 Good Riddance
 Guttermouth
 Hogan's Heroes
 JFA
 Jughead's Revenge
 Lagwagon
 Millencolin
 Much the Same
 MxPx
 NOFX 
 No Use for a Name
 The Offspring
 Pennywise
 Phinius Gage
 Propagandhi
 Pulley
 RKL
 Screeching Weasel
 Slick Shoes
 Strung Out
 Suicidal Tendencies
 The Suicide Machines
 Sum 41
 Tales of Terror
 Ten Foot Pole
 Trash Boat
 Trash Talk
 Unwritten Law
 Useless ID
 The Vandals

References 

Skate punk
Skateboarding
Lists of punk bands